Đức Xuân may refer to several places in Vietnam, including:

Đức Xuân, Bắc Kạn, a ward of Bắc Kạn
Đức Xuân, Hà Giang, a commune of Bắc Quang District  
Đức Xuân, Hòa An, a commune of Hòa An District in Cao Bằng Province
Đức Xuân, Thạch An, a commune of Thạch An District in Cao Bằng Province